Richard Thomas Condon (March 18, 1915 – April 9, 1996) was an American political novelist. Though his works were satire, they were generally transformed into thrillers or semi-thrillers in other media, such as cinema. All 26 books were written in distinctive Condon style, which combined a fast pace, outrage, and frequent humor while focusing almost obsessively on monetary greed and political corruption. Condon himself once said: "Every book I've ever written has been about abuse of power. I feel very strongly about that. I'd like people to know how deeply their politicians wrong them." Condon's books were occasionally bestsellers, and a number of his books were made into films; he is primarily remembered for his 1959 The Manchurian Candidate and, many years later, a series of four novels about a family of New York gangsters named Prizzi.

Condon's writing was known for its complex plotting, fascination with trivia, and loathing for those in power; at least two of his books featured thinly disguised versions of Richard Nixon. His characters tend to be driven by obsession, usually sexual or political, and family loyalty. His plots often have elements of classical tragedy, with protagonists whose pride leads them to destroy what they love. Some of his books, most notably Mile High (1969), are perhaps best described as secret history. And Then We Moved to Rossenarra is a humorous autobiographical recounting of various places in the world where he had lived and his family's 1970s move to Rossenarra, Co. Kilkenny, Ireland.

Early life 
Born in New York City, Condon attended DeWitt Clinton High School.

After service in the United States Merchant Marine, Condon achieved moderate success as a Hollywood publicist, ad writer and Hollywood agent. Condon turned to writing in 1957. Employed by United Artists as an ad writer, he complained that he was wasting time in Hollywood and wanted to write a novel. Without Condon's knowledge, his boss, Max E. Youngstein, deducted money from his salary, then fired him after a year, returning the amount of money he had deducted in the form of a Mexican bank account and the key to a house overlooking the ocean in Mexico. Youngstein told him to write his book. His second novel, The Manchurian Candidate (1959), featured a dedication to Youngstein and was made into a successful film.

Basic theme throughout Condon's books

In Mile High, his eighth novel, one primarily about how a single spectacularly ruthless gangster named Eddie West imposes Prohibition upon an unwary populace, Condon sums up the theme of all his books in a single angry cri de coeur:
Prohibition fused the amateurism and catch-as-catch-can national tendencies of the early days of the republic with a more modern, highly organized lust for violence and the quick buck. It fused the need to massacre twelve hundred thousand American Indians and ten million American buffalo, the lynching bees, the draft riots, bread riots, gold riots and race riots, the constant wars, the largest rats in the biggest slums, boxing and football, the loudest music, the most strident and exploitative press with the entire wonderful promise of tomorrow and tomorrow, always dragging the great nation downward into greater violence and more unnecessary deaths, into newer and more positive celebration of nonlife, all so that the savage, simple-minded people might be educated into greater frenzies of understanding that power and money are the only desirable objects for this life.

"Manchurian Candidate"

Although not perhaps actually originated by Condon himself, his use of "the Manchurian Candidate" made that phrase a part of the English language. Frank Rich, for example, in his column in the "Sunday Opinion" of The New York Times of August 17, 2008, writes about Barack Obama with a reference to both a well-known actress and a well-known plot element (which he gets wrong) in the first movie version of Condon's 1959 book:

[Obama's] been done in by that ad with Britney [Spears] and Paris [Hilton] and a new international crisis that allows [John] McCain to again flex his Manchurian Candidate military cred. Let the neocons identify a new battleground for igniting World War III... and McCain gets with the program as if Angela Lansbury has just dealt him the Queen of Hearts.

"The fiction of information"

Condon's works are difficult to categorize precisely: A 1971 Time magazine review declared that, "Condon was never a satirist: he was a riot in a satire factory. He raged at Western civilization and every last one of its works. He decorticated the Third Reich, cheese fanciers, gossip columnists and the Hollywood star system with equal and total frenzy." The headline of his obituary in The New York Times called him a "political novelist", but went on to say that, "Novelist is too limited a word to encompass the world of Mr. Condon. He was also a visionary, a darkly comic conjurer, a student of American mythology and a master of conspiracy theories, as vividly demonstrated in 'The Manchurian Candidate'." Although his books combined many different elements, including occasional outright fantasy and science fiction, they were, above all, written to entertain the general public. He had, however, a genuine disdain, outrage, and even hatred for many of the mainstream political corruptions that he found so prevalent in American life. In a 1977 quotation, he said that:

...people are being manipulated, exploited, murdered by their servants, who have convinced these savage, simple-minded populations that they are their masters, and that it hurts the head, if one thinks. People accept servants as masters. My novels are merely entertaining persuasions to get the people to think in other categories.

With his long lists of absurd trivia and "mania for absolute details", Condon was, along with Ian Fleming, one of the early exemplars of those called by Pete Hamill in a New York Times review, "the practitioners of what might be called the New Novelism... Condon applies a dense web of facts to fiction.... There might really be two kinds of fiction: the fiction of sensibility and the fiction of information... As a practitioner of the fiction of information, no one else comes close to him."

Quirks and characteristics

Condon attacked his targets wholeheartedly but with a uniquely original style and wit that made almost any paragraph from one of his books instantly recognizable. Reviewing one of his works in the International Herald Tribune, playwright George Axelrod (The Seven Year Itch, Will Success Spoil Rock Hunter), who had collaborated with Condon on the screenplay for the film adaptation of The Manchurian Candidate, wrote:
The arrival of a new novel by Richard Condon is like an invitation to a party.... the sheer gusto of the prose, the madness of his similes, the lunacy of his metaphors, his infectious, almost child-like joy in composing complex sentences that go bang at the end in the manner of exploding cigars is both exhilarating and as exhausting as any good party ought to be.

Metaphors and similes
From his 1975 novel, Money Is Love, comes a fine example of the "lunacy of his metaphors": "Mason took in enough cannabis smoke to allow a Lipan Apache manipulating a blanket over it to transmit the complete works of Tennyson."

The Manchurian Candidate offers:
The effects of the narcotics, techniques, and suggestions... achieved a result that approximated the impact an entire twenty-five-cent jar of F. W. Woolworth vanishing cream might have on vanishing an aircraft carrier of the Forrestal class when rubbed into the armor plate.

Lists and trivia
Condon was also enamored of long lists of detailed trivia that, while at least marginally pertinent to the subject at hand, are almost always an exercise in gleeful exaggeration and joyful spirits. In An Infinity of Mirrors, for instance, those in attendance of the funeral of a famous French actor and notable lover are delineated as:

Seven ballerinas of an amazing spectrum of ages were at graveside. Actresses of films, opera, music halls, the theatre, radio, carnivals, circuses, pantomimes, and lewd exhibitions mourned in the front line. There were also society leaders, lady scientists, women politicians, mannequins, couturières, Salvation Army lassies, all but one of his wives, a lady wrestler, a lady matador, twenty-three lady painters, four lady sculptors, a car-wash attendant, shopgirls, shoplifters, shoppers, and the shopped; a zoo assistant, two choir girls, a Métro attendant from the terminal at the Bois de Vincennes, four beauty-contest winners, a chambermaid; the mothers of children, the mothers of men, the grandmothers of children and the grandmothers of men; and the general less specialized, female public-at-large which had come from eleven European countries, women perhaps whom he had only pinched or kissed absent-mindedly while passing through his busy life. They attended twenty-eight hundred and seventy strong, plus eleven male friends of the deceased.

Writing about The Whisper of the Axe in the daily book review column of Friday, May 21, 1976, in the New York Times, Richard R. Lingeman praised the book in particular and Condon in general for his "extravagance of invention unique with him."

Not everyone was as exhilarated by Condon's antics, however. In a long Times Sunday review just two days after Lingeman's, Roger Sale excoriated Condon as a writer of "how-to books" in general, this book in particular, and Condon's habit of using lists: "A lot of it is done with numbers arbitrarily chosen to falsely simulate precision."

Real-life names in his books

All of Condon's books have, to an unknown degree, the names of real people in them as characters, generally very minor or peripheral. The most common, which appears in all of his books, is some variation of Franklin M. Heller. Among them are F.M. Heller, Frank Heller, Franz Heller, Marxie Heller, and F. Marx Heller. The real-life Heller was a television director in New York City in the 1950s, '60s, and 70s, who initially lived on Long Island and then moved to a house on Rockrimmon Road in Stamford, Connecticut.<ref>[http://www.dga.org/news/mag_archives/v22-4/frank_heller.htm Remembrance of Frank Heller," by Ira Skutch, at]</ref>  Beginning with Mile High in 1969, mentions of a Rockrimmon Road or Rockrimmon House also began to appear regularly in the novels. Late in life Heller grew a thick white beard and became a devotee of needlework—both traits that the fictional Hellers shared, sometimes to ludicrous effect, as when a battle-hardened Admiral Heller is depicted issuing orders while absorbed in needlework. The real-life Heller made one needlework depiction of the manor house in Ireland in which Condon was living at the time. In Prizzi's Honor, Marxie Heller is a mobster and murder victim; in Prizzi's Family, Franklin Heller is the mayor of New York City; in Prizzi's Glory, the Heller Administration is mentioned, implying that he is the president of the United States.

Condon was a great friend of actor Allan Melvin, having written a nightclub act for him. Condon later became a publicist for The Phil Silvers Show (Sgt. Bilko), on which Melvin played Cpl. Henshaw. Melvin's name shows up in several Condon books, most prominently as hitman Al (the Plumber) Melvini in Prizzi's Honor (a play on Melvin's "Al the Plumber" character in Liquid-Plumr commercials.)   In The Manchurian Candidate, with the exception of Marco, Shaw and Mavole, all of Marco's platoon members are named for the cast/crew of Bilko: (Nat) Hiken, (Maurice) Gosfield, (Jimmy) Little, (Phil) Silvers, (Allan) Melvin, (Mickey) Freeman and (Harvey) Lembeck.

In Prizzi's Honor, a New York City policeman named McCarry is mentioned once; the political thriller writer Charles McCarry was a friend of Condon's and, as a former operative of the CIA, was a occasional source of expertise in the field of espionage for Condon.

In a number of books a character named Keifetz appears, named apparently for Norman Keifetz, a New York City author who wrote a novel about a major league baseball player called The Sensation—that novel was dedicated to Condon.

A.H. Weiler, a film critic for The New York Times, was another friend of Condon's who made several fictional appearances, usually as Abraham Weiler but sometimes as a Dr. Abe Weiler.

In The Oldest Confession, a character has lunch in a Paris bistro and briefly meets two people playing chess at the bar, "Buchwald and Nolan, newspaper and airline peons respectively". Buchwald is certainly Art Buchwald, the celebrated newspaper columnist and humorist, who, at the time of the book's publication, was still working for The International Herald-Tribune, which was published in Paris, where Condon had also lived during the 1950s. The identity of Nolan, however, remains a mystery.

Career in films

For many years a Hollywood publicity man for Walt Disney and other studios, Condon took up writing relatively late in life and his first novel, The Oldest Confession, was not published until he was 43. The demands of his career with United Artists—promoting movies such as The Pride and the Passion and The King and Four Queens—led to a series of bleeding ulcers and a determination to do something else.

His next book, The Manchurian Candidate, combined all the elements that defined his works for the next 30 years: nefarious conspiracies, satire, black humor, outrage at political and financial corruption in the American scene, breath-taking elements from thrillers and spy fiction, horrific and grotesque violence, and an obsession with the minutiae of food, drink, and fast living. It quickly made him, for a few years at least, the center of a cult devoted to his works. As he rapidly produced more and more books with the same central themes, however, this following fell away and his critical reputation diminished. Still, over the next three decades Condon produced works that returned him to favor, both with the critics and the book-buying public, such as Mile High, Winter Kills, and the first of the Prizzi books, Prizzi's Honor.

Of his numerous books that were turned into Hollywood movies, The Manchurian Candidate was filmed twice. The first version, in 1962, which starred Frank Sinatra, Laurence Harvey, Janet Leigh, and Angela Lansbury, followed the book with great fidelity, and is now highly regarded as a glimpse into the mindset of its era. Janet Maslin, writing already over two decades ago, said in The New York Times In 1996 that it was "arguably the most chilling piece of cold war paranoia ever committed to film, yet by now it has developed a kind of innocence."

The Keener's Manual

Beginning with his first book, The Oldest Confession, Condon frequently prefaced his novels with excerpts of verse from a so-called Keener's Manual; these epigraphs foreshadowed the theme of the book or, in several instances, gave the book its title. The Keener's Manual, however, was a fictional invention by Condon and does not actually exist. A "keen" is a "lamentation for the dead uttered in a loud wailing voice or sometimes in a wordless cry"  and a "keener" is a professional mourner, usually a woman in Ireland, who "utters the keen... at a wake or funeral."

Five of Condon's first six books derived their titles from the fictional manual, the only exception being his most famous book, The Manchurian Candidate. The epigraph in The Manchurian Candidate, however, "I am you and you are me /and what have we done to each other?" is a recurring theme in earlier Condon's books: in various forms it also appears as dialog in both The Oldest Confession and Some Angry Angel. Among other epigraphs, the last line of "The riches I bring you /Crowding and shoving, /Are the envy of princes: /A talent for loving." is the title of Condon's fourth novel. His fifth and sixth novels, An Infinity of Mirrors and Any God Will Do, also derive their titles from excerpts of the manual.

Years later, Condon's 1988 novel Prizzi's Glory also had an epigraph from the manual, the first one in at least a dozen books.

Plagiarism charge

In 1998, a Californian software engineer noticed several paragraphs in The Manchurian Candidate that appeared nearly identical to portions of the celebrated 1934 novel I, Claudius by the English writer Robert Graves. She wrote about the apparent plagiarism on her website, but her discovery went unnoticed by most of the world until Adair Lara, a longtime San Francisco Chronicle staff writer, wrote a lengthy article about the accusation in 2003.  Reprinting the paragraphs in question, she also solicited the opinion of a British forensic linguist, who concluded that Condon had unquestionably plagiarized at least two paragraphs of Graves's work. By this time, however, more than seven years had passed since Condon's death, and Lara's article also failed to generate any literary interest outside the Chronicle.

In Some Angry Angel, the book that followed The Manchurian Candidate, Condon makes a direct reference to Graves. In a long, convoluted passage on page 25, Condon reflects on "mistresses" and their relationship—a peripheral one, to the reader—to Graves's writings about "Major Male" Deities and "Major Female" Deities. As Angel was published only a year after Candidate, there is no question, therefore, about Condon's familiarity with the works of Robert Graves.

Works
All novels except as noted:

 The Oldest Confession, Appleton-Century-Crofts, New York, 1958, Library of Congress Catalog Card Number: 58-8662; Longman, London, 1959, as The Happy Thieves The Manchurian Candidate, McGraw-Hill, New York, 1959, Library of Congress Catalog Card Number: 59-8533
 Some Angry Angel: A Mid-Century Faerie Tale, McGraw-Hill, New York, 1960, Library of Congress Catalog Card Number: 60-8826
 A Talent for Loving; or, The Great Cowboy Race, McGraw-Hill, New York, 1961, Library of Congress Catalog Card Number:61-10467; later made into the film version A Talent for Loving (1969) for which Condon himself wrote the script
 An Infinity of Mirrors, Random House, New York, 1964, Library of Congress Catalog Card Number: 64-17935
 Any God Will Do, Random House, New York, 1964, Library of Congress Catalog Card Number: 66-21462
 The Ecstasy Business, The Dial Press, New York, 1967, Library of Congress Catalog Card Number: 67-14467
 Mile High, The Dial Press, New York, 1969, Library of Congress Catalog Card Number: 77-80497
 The Vertical Smile (1971)
 Arigato (1972)
 The Mexican Stove (1973)—cookbook co-written with his daughter Wendy Bennett
 And Then We Moved to Rossenarra: or, The Art of Emigrating, The Dial Press, New York, 1973, PS3553.0487z5—memoir
 Winter Kills (1974)
 The Star-Spangled Crunch (1974)
 Money Is Love (1975)
 The Whisper of the Axe (1976)
 The Abandoned Woman (1977)
 Death of a Politician (1978)
 Bandicoot (1979)
 The Entwining (1981)
 Prizzi's Honor (1982)
 A Trembling upon Rome (1983)
 Prizzi's Family (1986)
 Prizzi's Glory (1988)
 Emperor of America (1990)
 The Final Addiction (1991)
 The Venerable Bead (1992)
 Prizzi's Money (1994)

Films adapted from Condon novels

 The Happy Thieves, from The Oldest Confession, 1961
 The Manchurian Candidate, 1962
 A Talent for Loving, 1969
 Winter Kills, 1979
 Prizzi's Honor, 1985
 The Manchurian Candidate, 2004

Articles
 "'Manchurian Candidate' in Dallas". The Nation'', December 28, 1963.

References

1915 births
1996 deaths
20th-century American novelists
DeWitt Clinton High School alumni
Writers Guild of America Award winners
American male novelists
20th-century American male writers
Novelists from New York (state)
Best Adapted Screenplay BAFTA Award winners
20th-century American screenwriters